This article is a list of diseases of fuchsias (Fuchsia × hybrida).

Bacterial diseases

Fungal diseases

Viral and viroid diseases

References
Common Names of Diseases, The American Phytopathological Society

Fuchsia
Fuchsia